Eero Pekka Sakari Markkanen (born 3 July 1991) is a Finnish professional footballer who plays as a striker for Gnistan. He is the son of former basketball player Pekka Markkanen and the older brother of basketball player Lauri Markkanen.

Markkanen made his international debut for Finland in May 2014, at the age of 22 and has since had over 15 caps, including 6 appearances in 2018 FIFA World Cup qualifications.

Club career

FC Jyväskylä Blackbird 

Markkanen made his debut on senior level in Blackbird in season 2010.

Vihtavuoren Pamaus 

For season 2011 he played for ViPa in the Finnish Kakkonen.

JJK Jyväskylä 

In 2012 he returned to JJK and made his Veikkausliiga debut.

AIK Fotboll

In December 2013 it was announced that AIK had signed Markkanen on a 3 year contract.

Real Madrid

On 23 July 2014, Real Madrid signed Markkanen from AIK on a four-year contract.

In September 2014, he was chosen for Real Madrid's 25-man squad for the UEFA Champions League, but did not make any appearances.

On 21 August 2015, Real Madrid released Markkanen. There were rumours of him reporting back to preseason training overweight, but the club never released an official statement about the issue.

Real Madrid Castilla 
Markkanen made his debut for Real Madrid's reserve team Real Madrid Castilla in Segunda División B on 24 August 2014, playing the full 90 minutes as they lost 2–1 at Atlético Madrid B in Segunda División B Group 2. Six days later he scored his first goal for the club, in a 1–2 home loss to Getafe B. However, he missed most of the 2014-2015 season due to injury.

Rovaniemen Palloseura 

On 3 September 2015, Markkanen was acquired by the Finnish side RoPS for the remainder of the season after failing to sign for AIK who were rejected a request for an exemption to sign him outside of the transfer window by the Swedish Football Association.

Return to AIK

On 5 November 2015, he signed a three-year contract with AIK. He told the club homepage that he was "Very happy to be back at AIK".

On 4 August 2017, Markkanen joined 2. Bundesliga side Dynamo Dresden on loan for the season, while Dynamo Dresden secured an option to sign him permanently.

On 15 January 2018, Markkanen broke his contract with Dynamo Dresden and went on to join Danish Superliga side Randers on loan from AIK for the rest of the 2017-18 season.

He returned to AIK in late June 2018, but left the club by mutual consent on 10 August 2018.

Dalkurd FF

On 10 August 2018, Markkanen signed with Dalkurd in Allsvenskan.

PSM Makassar

On 14 January 2019 it was announced that Markkanen would join PSM Makassar in Liga 1.

FC Haka

On 7 February 2020 Veikkausliiga side Haka announced that Markkanen would be joining the club on a one-year contract.

Orange County SC
On 25 December 2020, it was announced that Markkanen would join USL Championship side Orange County ahead of their 2021 season.

HIFK Fotboll
On 28 February 2022, Markkanen signed with HIFK.

International career
Markkanen made his full international debut on 29 May 2014, replacing Roman Eremenko at half time in a 1–0 defeat to Lithuania in Ventspils in the Baltic Cup. On 7 September 2014, he made his first competitive international appearance, replacing Jere Uronen for the last 15 minutes of a 3–1 win over the Faroe Islands in Tórshavn for UEFA Euro 2016 qualifying. After losing his place in the Finland squad during his spell in Real Madrid Castilla he was once again selected by head coach Hasse Backe in August 2016 for games again Germany and Kosovo. This was after a good summer form with five goals in the last two months for AIK.
He made his FIFA World Cup qualification match debut on 6 October 2016 in a match against Iceland when he entered as a 56th minute substitute for Kasper Hämäläinen.

Career statistics

International

International goals
Scores and results list Finland's goal tally first.

Honours
HJK Helsinki
 Veikkausliiga: 2013

PSM Makassar
 Piala Indonesia: 2019

Orange County SC
 USL Championship: 2021

References

External links

 Dynamo Dresden official profile 
 Eero Markkanen – SPL competition record
 
 
 
 

1991 births
Sportspeople from Jyväskylä
Living people
Finnish footballers
Finland international footballers
Association football forwards
JJK Jyväskylä players
Helsingin Jalkapalloklubi players
AIK Fotboll players
Real Madrid Castilla footballers
Rovaniemen Palloseura players
Dynamo Dresden players
Randers FC players
Dalkurd FF players
PSM Makassar players
FC Haka players
Orange County SC players
HIFK Fotboll players
Kakkonen players
Veikkausliiga players
Allsvenskan players
Segunda División B players
2. Bundesliga players
Danish Superliga players
Indonesian Super League players
USL Championship players
Finnish expatriate footballers
Expatriate footballers in Sweden
Expatriate footballers in Spain
Expatriate footballers in Germany
Expatriate men's footballers in Denmark
Expatriate footballers in Indonesia
Expatriate soccer players in the United States
Finnish expatriate sportspeople in Sweden
Finnish expatriate sportspeople in Spain
Finnish expatriate sportspeople in Germany
Finnish expatriate sportspeople in Denmark
Finnish expatriate sportspeople in Indonesia
Finnish expatriate sportspeople in the United States